Joelle Lu is a Taiwanese actress.

Filmography

Television series

Films

References

External links

 
 

1976 births
21st-century Taiwanese actresses
Actresses from Taipei
Living people
Taiwanese film actresses
Taiwanese stage actresses
Taiwanese television actresses